The Final Chapter is the fifth studio album by American rapper C-Bo, released March 9, 1999 on AWOL Records. It peaked at number 81 on the Billboard 200 and at number 20 on the Billboard Top R&B/Hip-Hop Albums. The album was released after C-Bo had left AWOL Records and is composed of unreleased music C-Bo recorded while on the label. It was his last album of new material released on AWOL, hence the title, The Final Chapter.

West Coast Mafia Records, C-Bo's own label, reissued The Final Chapter in 2003 with bonus tracks.

Track listing 
"Intro to the Final Chapter" - 0:33
"How Many" (featuring Lil Ric & 151) - 4:24
"Get the Chips" (featuring Flow & Pizzo) - 4:21
"Best Recognize" (featuring Probable Cauze) - 4:32
"Player to Player" (featuring Mo-Jay & Allie Baba) - 4:27
"Big Figgas" (featuring AK, Kokane & 151) - 5:03
"Interlude" - 0:48
"Tru 2 Da Game" (featuring J-Dubb & Lil Ric) - 4:27
"Still Mashin" (featuring Flow & Pizzo) - 4:23
"As the World Turns" (featuring AP.9, Spice 1 & Sherrelle Fortier) - 4:56
"Mobb Deep" (featuring Laroo & 151) - 4:16
"Big Boss" (featuring King Pins, Laroo & Raw Pins) - 4:51
"My True Soldiers" (featuring Mo-Jay) - 1:42

2003 CD reissue bonus tracks 
The album was re-released December 8, 2003 with the following bonus tracks:

"Ball Till We Fall" (featuring Killa Tay) - 5:04
"Earn Respect" (featuring Revenge) - 3:53

Chart history

References

External links 
[ The Final Chapter] at Allmusic
The Final Chapter at Discogs
The Final Chapter at MusicBrainz
The Final Chapter (reissue) at Discogs
 The Final Chapter (reissue) at Tower Records

C-Bo albums
1999 albums
Self-released albums